Merit is an unincorporated community in Hunt County, Texas, United States. It is 15 miles northwest of Greenville. Merit has a post office with the ZIP code 75458. The Bland Independent School District serves area students.

History
Settlement of the site began sometime in the late 1860s or early 1870s through the efforts of Dr. O. Murcheson, who named the town for a Judge Merritt. The community received a post office in 1884. Two years later the tracks of the Gulf, Colorado, and Santa Fe Railway reached the settlement, and by the early 1890s the railroad had established Merit as a shipping point for area farmers. At that time the town had a steam cotton gin, a gristmill, some 20 other businesses, and 300 residents. By the eve of World War I the community's population had increased to 500, and the number of businesses to more than 25, including two banks. 

During World War II the population of Merit declined. In 1945 the town had an estimated 300 residents and six businesses. Three years later the Merit and Floyd school districts were consolidated under the name Bland. The number of Merit residents declined to 185 in the early 1950s. During the 1970s its population began to grow again, and in 1988 through 2000 the town reported a population of 215.

Climate
The area's climate is characterized by hot, humid summers and generally mild to cool winters. The Köppen climate classification system indicates Merit has a humid subtropical climate, Cfa on climate maps.

Notable residents
Clint Lorance (born 1984), Army officer convicted of second-degree murder for battlefield deaths; pardoned

References

External links
 

Unincorporated communities in Hunt County, Texas
Dallas–Fort Worth metroplex
Unincorporated communities in Texas